Gaucher is a French surname. Notable people with the surname include:

Charles-Étienne Gaucher (1740–1804), French engraver
Elias Gaucher, French publisher
Eric Gaucher (born 1972), American biologist
Guillaume Gamelin Gaucher (1810–1885), Canadian businessman and politician
Guy Gaucher (1930–2014), French Catholic Discalced Carmelite bishop and theologian
Jules Gaucher (1905–1954), French Army officer
Kim Gaucher (born 1984), Canadian women's basketball player
Nathan Gaucher (born 2003), Canadian ice hockey player
Philippe Gaucher (1854–1918), French dermatologist
Roland Gaucher (1919–2007), French journalist and politician
Ryan Gaucher (born 1978), Canadian ice hockey player
Yves Gaucher (1934–2000), Canadian painter and printmaker

See also
Gaucher's disease

French-language surnames